The Central Telegraph Office is a building in Colombo, Sri Lanka, that housed the Ceylon Telegraph Department, the precursor to Sri Lanka Telecom. It is situated at Colombo fort along Duke Street, across from the headquarters of the Colombo Metropolitan Police; it was built in 1910 or 1911 and is used by Sri Lanka Telecom.

Radio Ceylon began its initial broadcasts from this building in 1923 with transmitting equipment from a captured World War I German U-boat. A bomb was detonated in the building in 1986 by Janatha Vimukthi Peramuna (JVP) an outlawed Sinhalese group, resulting in the deaths of 14 people and causing much damage to the building. It underwent a restoration following this incident.

External links & References 

 

Former government buildings in Sri Lanka
Buildings and structures in Colombo
British colonial architecture in Sri Lanka